Adesmus nigriventris is a species of beetle in the family Cerambycidae. It was described by Fleutiaux and Sallé in 1889. It is known from Guadeloupe.

References

Adesmus
Beetles described in 1889